The Moths! were an English indie rock band from London. They made new wave and post-punk pop and had drawn comparisons with the Human League, Wire, the Buzzcocks and early Adam and the Ants.

History
The band started in August 2006 with James Fox (lead vocals, lyrics), Dave Lightfoot (guitars, music) and Jon Vick (synthesizer, production) creating bedroom demos and placing them on MySpace to great critical acclaim. The band were quickly picked up for development.

Their first EP Games was released as a triple A-side with "Wild Birds" and "Valentine" by indie label Fandango. It was hailed by Artrocker and received critical acclaim from NME, as well as gaining extensive radio support from Zane Lowe (BBC Radio 1) and XFM. It was also named single of the week by Steve Lamacq (BBC) and the band were invited to record live sessions with John Kennedy (XFM) and Marc Riley (BBC 6 Music).

In 2007, they were touring the UK and Sweden, supporting bands including Foals, Good Shoes and The 1990s. Founder member Jon Vick left the band around the middle of 2007 and The Moths! briefly became a full live band with extra members before disbanding in December of that year.

Compilation
(The Moths! - Recorded 2006-07, published 2012)

Singles & EP's
-(Tell Me - Single - 2012)
-(Wild Birds - Re-Recorded - 2019)
- (Valentine - Re-Recorded - 2020)

References

External links
BBC feature, March 2007
SoundXP interview, May 2007
Dayrobber interview, February 2008
Video for Tell Me

English indie rock groups
Musical groups from London
Musical groups established in 2006